Osiedle-Nowiny  is a village in Kielce County, Świętokrzyskie Voivodeship, in south-central Poland. It is the seat of the gmina (administrative district) called Gmina Sitkówka-Nowiny.

The village has a population of 2,542.

References

Osiedle-Nowiny
Kielce Governorate
Kielce Voivodeship (1919–1939)